Matías Nicolas Pavoni Escabuso (born 25 September 1980) is an Argentine retired footballer who played as an attacking midfielder.

After starting his career with Newell's Old Boys he played mostly with Cádiz, representing the club in La Liga, Segunda División and Segunda División B and appearing in a total of 168 competitive matches (29 goals).

Football career
Born in Buenos Aires, Pavoni began his senior career playing for Newell's Old Boys in the Primera División. In 2001, he was sold to neighbouring Central Córdoba de Rosario of the Primera B Nacional.

Pavoni moved to Europe for the 2002–03 season, joining Cádiz CF in Spain and scoring a career-best nine goals in his first year as the team promoted from Segunda División B. He was again instrumental two years later, netting eight times in 39 matches for the Andalusians who returned to La Liga after an absence of 12 years.

Pavoni made his debut in Spain's top flight on 28 August 2005, scoring in a 1–2 home loss against Real Madrid. Cádiz were eventually relegated at the end of the campaign as second from bottom, and the player appeared sparingly during the following years due to injury, also reportedly being due in wages.

Pavoni retired in December 2010 at the age of only 30, after an unassuming spell with Greece's Asteras Tripoli F.C. and more than two years without a club.

Honours
Cádiz
Segunda División: 2004–05

References

External links
 Argentine League statistics  
 
 Stats and bio at Cadistas1910 

1980 births
Living people
Argentine people of Italian descent
Citizens of Italy through descent
Footballers from Buenos Aires
Argentine footballers
Association football midfielders
Argentine Primera División players
Primera Nacional players
Newell's Old Boys footballers
Central Córdoba de Rosario footballers
La Liga players
Segunda División players
Segunda División B players
Cádiz CF players
Super League Greece players
Asteras Tripolis F.C. players
Argentine expatriate footballers
Expatriate footballers in Spain
Expatriate footballers in Greece
Argentine expatriate sportspeople in Spain